Zostera angustifolia is a marine plant with creeping underground stems.

Description
This species is similar to Zostera marina. Its leaves are narrower and are about 25 cm long and no more than 3 mm wide. The sheaths form a tube around the stem. The branched inflorescence is about 10 cm long.

Ecology
Estuaries and muddy areas at mid-tide and lower.

References

angustifolia